The Tavern Club, 4 Boylston Place in downtown Boston, Massachusetts, is a private social club established in 1884.

Brief history
The Tavern Club was founded in 1884 by Royal Whitman, T. Adamowski, B.C. Porter, George Munzig, and Frederick Prince. Charter members included Arthur Rotch and others. Membership is by invitation; in recent years membership includes women. Notable members of the club have included William Dean Howells, Henry Cabot Lodge, Henry James, and Charles Eliot Norton.

In February, 1885, the club adopted the Totem of Bear, which continues today as mascot for the group.

Frequent dinners, lectures, and musical and theatrical performances take place in the club for the members and their guests. In March 1885, Mark Twain attended a dinner in his honor, and another in 1901. Dinners have been given in honor of many others, including Elihu Vedder (1887), Rudyard Kipling (1895), Oliver Wendell Holmes (1902), John Singer Sargent (1903), Booker T. Washington (1905), Winston Churchill (1907), Norman Angell (1913), George Macaulay Trevelyan (1924), Owen Wister (1929), Ignace Paderewski (1930).

A pervasive sense of humor and occasion characterizes many club activities. In 1903, the club won the baseball Challenge Cup against rival St. Botolph Club. The 1907 Annual Meeting treated the Members to a Puppy Raffle. Also in 1907 Taverners in 16th century German costume participated in the Copley Society's artists festival, along with other local groups.

Some notable members 
Notable members have included: Timothee Adamowski, Winthrop Ames, George Pierce Baker, Arlo Bates, Frank Weston Benson, Henry Forbes Bigelow, William Sturgis Bigelow, Henry Pickering Bowditch, Edward Burnett, Frederick Shepherd Converse, Francis Hatch, Augustus Hemenway, Henry Lee Higginson, Adams Sherman Hill, Oliver Wendell Holmes Jr., Mark Antony DeWolfe Howe, William Dean Howells, Alexander Wadsworth Longfellow, Guy Lowell, George Howard Monks, Charles Eliot Norton, Bliss Perry, Benjamin Curtis Porter, Bela Lyon Pratt, Arthur Rotch, Frederic Jesup Stimson, R. Clipston Sturgis, Edmund Charles Tarbell, Eliot Wadsworth,  Dennis Miller Bunker, Langdon Warner, and Barrett Wendell.

See also
 List of American gentlemen's clubs

References

Further reading

Publications of the club
 
 
 Edward Weeks. The Tavern at seventy-five, 1934-1959: a medley. Cambridge, Massachusetts: Printed for the Tavern Club, 1959.
 Charles B Everitt. The Tavern Club at one hundred 1959-1984. Boston: Tavern Club, 1984.
 Thomas A. Halsted. The Tavern Club at One Hundred and Twenty-Five, 1984-2009,  Quasquicentennial History. Boston: Tavern Club, 2009

About the club
 Boston's Clubs; Where Men Cultivate the Social Virtues. Boston Daily Globe, Dec 28, 1885; p. 5.
 
 Clever and good; That is the Kind of Fellow the Tavern Club Admits; Boston Institution to Which Belong the Swellest Bright Men in Town; Its Beginning, Half a Dozen Diners in Out-of-the-Way Italian Restaurant. Boston Daily Globe, Oct 23, 1892; p. 18.
 A story of "The Ensign"; Why the Author Failed to Secure "Historical Actors" for His Play. Tavern Club to Represent ... Preached to Colored Pylhians. Boston Daily Globe, Apr 12, 1897; p. 8.
 Well-known Bostonians play ball; Tavern Club Beats St Botolph 27 to 12 and Wins the Challenge Cup. Boston Daily Globe, Jun 3, 1903. p. 3.
 Honor for Hadley; Head of Yale is Guest of Tavern Club—Pres Eliot Joins Others in Cheers For the Blue of Old Eli. Boston Daily Globe, Feb 10, 1907. p. 14.
 Tavern Club puts one over; St Botolph Ties the Score Three Times All in Vain at Annual Game; With Amusing Mixups. Boston Daily Globe, Jun 26, 1913. p. 5.
 Tavern Club supports Wilson and urges war. Boston Daily Globe, Apr 1, 1917. p. 10.
 Walter Muir Whitehill. The Neighborhood of the Tavern Club, 1630-1971. Bostonian Society, 1971.
 Peggy Hernandez. At Tavern Club women's roles saved for men. Boston Globe, Sep 21, 1988. p. 1.
 Tavern Club's male-only policy questioned. Boston Globe, Sep 30, 1988. p. 20.
 Peggy Hernandez. Tavern Club votes to admit women. Boston Globe, Oct 26, 1988. p. 1.

External links

 Official website

1884 establishments in Massachusetts
Boston Theater District
Clubs and societies in Boston
Clubs and societies in the United States
Cultural history of Boston
Culture of Boston
Gentlemen's clubs in the United States
Organizations established in 1884